Udamailapitiya North Grama Niladhari Division is a Grama Niladhari Division of the Pathahewaheta Divisional Secretariat of Kandy District of Central Province, Sri Lanka. It has Grama Niladhari Division Code 1002.

Udamailapitiya North is a surrounded by the Pathamailapitiya North, Pathamailapitiya South, Kethigannawela and Udamailapitiya South Grama Niladhari Divisions.

Demographics

Ethnicity 
The Udamailapitiya North Grama Niladhari Division has a Sinhalese majority (96.3%). In comparison, the Pathahewaheta Divisional Secretariat (which contains the Udamailapitiya North Grama Niladhari Division) has a Sinhalese majority (90.1%)

Religion 
The Udamailapitiya North Grama Niladhari Division has a Buddhist majority (91.9%) and a Christian minority (7.0%). In comparison, the Pathahewaheta Divisional Secretariat (which contains the Udamailapitiya North Grama Niladhari Division) has a Buddhist majority (89.5%)

References 

Grama Niladhari Divisions of Pathahewaheta Divisional Secretariat
Geography of Kandy District